Ivan the Terrible (1530–1584), also known as Ivan IV, was a ruler of Russia.

Ivan the Terrible may also refer to:

People 
 Juan Kachmanian (1930–2020), Argentine wrestler
 Iván Zamorano (born 1967), Chilean football player a.k.a. Iván el Terrible
 Ivan Basso (born 1977), Italian bicycle racer a.k.a. Ivan il Terribile
 Ivan Boesky (born 1937), American businessman notable for his role in an insider trading scandal
 Ivan the Terrible (Treblinka guard) (born c. 1911), notorious guard at the Nazi German Treblinka extermination camp
 Iván Marino Ospina (1940–1985), Colombian guerilla

Works 
 Ivan the Terrible (ballet), a 1975 ballet choreographed by Yury Grigorovich
 Ivan IV (opera), 1865 opera by Georges Bizet
 The Wings of a Serf, also known as Ivan the Terrible, a 1926 film by Yuri Tarich
 Ivan the Terrible (1917 film), a 1917 Italian historical film
 Ivan the Terrible (1944 film), a 1944/1958 film by Sergei Eisenstein
 Ivan the Terrible (Prokofiev), musical score for the film
 Ivan the Terrible (TV series), 1970s comedy
 Ivan the Terrible (novel), 2007 children's novel by Anne Fine

Other uses 
Hurricane Ivan, 2004 storm